Silverlock may refer to:

 Silverlock, a novel by John Myers Myers
 Silverlock (software), password management utility software
 Wikipedia:SILVERLOCK